Meximieux is a commune in the Ain department in eastern France.

Geography
Located 35 km north east of Lyon and 10 km from Ambérieu-en-Bugey, the town is where the Dombes plateau meets the plain of the river Ain. Historically, Meximieux was part of the former province of Bresse. Over the centuries, its importance has developed from its location on the main route between Lyon and Geneva, and it now lies on the Autoroute 42 from Lyon. Meximieux—Pérouges station has rail connections to Lyon, Ambérieu-en-Bugey and Chambéry.

History
Records of Meximieux date back to Roman times when it home to a small farming settlement called  Maximiacus.

Population

Its inhabitants are known as Meximiards.

International relations
The commune has developed a twin town agreement with:

  Denkendorf, Germany since 1986. Located in the German state of Baden-Württemberg.

Personalities
The town was the birthplace of Claude Favre de Vaugelas, a 17th-century grammarian and man of letters.

Resistance
Meximieux is one of the 17 French cities to be awarded with the medal of resistance (Médaille de la Résistance). The French resistants of Meximieux fought with the allies in an outstanding collaboration with the U.S. army. This resulted in the victory against a German counter offensive on Meximieux the 1 and 2 September 1944.
U.S. Army General, Michael S. Davison, became an honorary citizen of Meximieux.

See also
Communes of the Ain department

References

External links

 Official site

Communes of Ain
Recipients of the Resistance Medal
Ain communes articles needing translation from French Wikipedia